Dendropsophus yaracuyanus is a species of frog in the family Hylidae.
It is endemic to Venezuela.
Its natural habitats are subtropical or tropical moist montane forests, rivers, freshwater marshes, and intermittent freshwater marshes.
It is threatened by habitat loss.

References

Sources

yaracuyanus
Amphibians described in 2000
Taxonomy articles created by Polbot